The name Champi has been used for two tropical cyclones in the western north Pacific Ocean. Champi replaced "Ketsana", which was retired after the 2009 Pacific typhoon season. The name was contributed by Laos and it refers to the red jasmine flower.

 Typhoon Champi (2015) (T1525, 25W) – a Category 4 typhoon that remained over the open ocean.
 Typhoon Champi (2021) (T2105, 06W) – a Category 1 typhoon that churned in the open ocean.

Pacific typhoon set index articles